Billy the Kid in Santa Fe is a 1941 American Western film directed by Sam Newfield. This film is the sixth in the "Billy the Kid" film series, produced by PRC from 1940 to 1946, and the last to star Bob Steele. In the next film, Billy the Kid Wanted, Steele was replaced by Buster Crabbe.

Plot
Billy the Kid escapes from jail after being framed for murder. His friends Jeff and Fuzzy help him, knowing that he didn't commit the murder. The trio travels to Sant Fe, where they run into Joe Benson, who had been paid by gang leader Barton to lie at Billy's trial.

Cast 
Bob Steele as Billy the Kid
Al St. John as Fuzzy Q. Jones
Rex Lease as Jeff
Marin Sais as Pat Walker - Bar W Owner
Dennis Moore as Silent Don Benson
Karl Hackett as Bert Davis - Bar W Foreman
Steve Clark as Allen
Hal Price as Carlton City Sheriff
Charles King as Steve Barton
Frank Ellis as Hank Baxter (Gunman)
Dave O'Brien as Texas Joe
Kenne Duncan as Scotty - Henchman

See also
The "Billy the Kid" films starring Bob Steele:
 Billy the Kid Outlawed (1940)
 Billy the Kid in Texas (1940)
 Billy the Kid's Gun Justice (1940)
 Billy the Kid's Range War (1941)
 Billy the Kid's Fighting Pals (1941)
 Billy the Kid in Santa Fe (1941)

External links 

1941 films
1941 Western (genre) films
American black-and-white films
Billy the Kid (film series)
Producers Releasing Corporation films
American Western (genre) films
Films directed by Sam Newfield
1940s English-language films
1940s American films